Mikhail Mikhailovich Yevseyev (born 11 January 1973) is a former Russian football player.

External links
 

1973 births
Footballers from Moscow
Living people
FC Dynamo Moscow reserves players
Soviet footballers
Russian footballers
FC Lokomotiv Moscow players
Russian Premier League players
FC Irtysh Omsk players
Association football defenders
FC Izhevsk players
FC Dynamo Kirov players